Paice is a surname. Notable people with the surname include:

David Paice (born 1983), rugby union footballer
George Paice (bowls) (born 1941), New Zealand-based Falkland Islands Lawn Bowler
George Paice (painter) (1854–1925), British landscape, canine, hunting, and equestrian painter
Ian Paice (born 1948), English musician and drummer with Deep Purple
Jacky Paice, founder of the British charity Sunflower Jam, wife of Deep Purple drummer Ian Paice
James Paice (born 1949), English Conservative Party politician
Jill Paice (born 1980), American actress best known for musical theatre roles
Margaret Paice (born 1920), Australian children's writer and illustrator
Mervyn Paice, kidnap and murder victim in the 1947 Sargeants Affair

See also
Pace (surname)
PACE (disambiguation)
Paico (disambiguation)
Paicu (disambiguation)
Paige (disambiguation)
Pais
Paix